The 1990 Geneva Open was a men's tennis tournament played on outdoor clay courts that was part of the World Series of the 1990 ATP Tour. It was the 11th edition of the tournament and was played at Geneva in Switzerland from 10 September through 17 September 1990. Second-seeded Horst Skoff won the singles title.

Finals

Singles

 Horst Skoff defeated  Sergi Bruguera 7–6(10–8), 7–6(7–4)
 It was Skoff's only title of the year and the 5th of his career.

Doubles

 Pablo Albano /  David Engel defeated  Neil Borwick /  David Lewis 6–3, 7–6
 It was Albano's only title of the year and the 1st of his career. It was Engel's only title of the year and the 1st of his career.

References

External links
 ITF tournament edition details

 
20th century in Geneva